Qulluta (Quechua for mortar, also spelled Collota) is a mountain in the Cordillera Negra in the Andes of Peru which reaches a height of approximately . It is located in the Ancash Region, Recuay Province, on the border of the districts of Huayllapampa and Marca.

References 

Mountains of Peru
Mountains of Ancash Region